Eastport is a hamlet and census-designated place (CDP) in Suffolk County, New York, on the South Shore of Long Island. The population was 1,831 at the 2010 census.

History
Eastport dates to the 1730s when a gristmill was built there. It started as two hamlets, Seatuck and Waterville, and in the 1850s applied for a post office by the name of Seatuck. It was refused because it was too similar to Setauket, New York. It was renamed Eastport.

In the first half of the 20th century it was the capital of the production of Long Island ducks, producing 6.5 million ducks a year from 29 farms going to market. Practically all duck farms have been phased out and the descendants of the original farmers sold the valuable waterfront property for residential development projects. Cornell University has a Duck Research Laboratory on Old Country Road (Suffolk CR 71).

Geography
Eastport straddles the border of the towns of Brookhaven and Southampton. 

Demographics

Demographics for the CDP
At the 2000 census, there were 1,454 people, 554 households and 373 families residing in the CDP. The population density was 264.7 per square mile (102.3/km2). There were 637 housing units at an average density of 116.0/sq mi (44.8/km2). The racial makeup of the CDP was 93.26% White, 0.83% African American, 0.28% Native American, 1.17% Asian, 2.54% from other races, and 1.93% from two or more races. Hispanic or Latino of any race were 9.35% of the population.

There were 554 households, of which 30.7% had children under the age of 18 living with them, 55.2% were married couples living together, 7.8% had a female householder with no husband present, and 32.5% were non-families. 27.4% of all households were made up of individuals, and 12.3% had someone living alone who was 65 years of age or older. The average household size was 2.54 and the average family size was 3.10.

Age distribution was 23.9% under the age of 18, 5.8% from 18 to 24, 30.7% from 25 to 44, 25.8% from 45 to 64, and 13.8% who were 65 years of age or older. The median age was 38 years. For every 100 females, there were 107.7 males. For every 100 females age 18 and over, there were 104.1 males.

The median income was $50,550, and the median family income was $52,917. Males had a median income of $40,163 versus $35,000 for females. The per capita income for the CDP was $24,391. About 5.7% of families and 6.6% of the population were below the poverty threshold, including 3.7% of those under age 18 and 2.2% of those age 65 or over.

Education
Eastport is located within the Eastport-South Manor Central School District.

Notable people

Scott Disick, American media personality and socialite

References

External links
 
Eastport, New York: World War I Monument: Globe Strutting Doughboy (Roadside America.com)

Brookhaven, New York
Southampton (town), New York
Hamlets in New York (state)
Census-designated places in New York (state)
Census-designated places in Suffolk County, New York
Hamlets in Suffolk County, New York
Populated coastal places in New York (state)